Finn Arnestad (23 September 1915 — 30 January 1994) was a Norwegian contemporary composer and musician.

Early life and career
Following his 1915 birth in Oslo, Arnestad completed his musical education in various European countries. From the 1950s to 1960s, Arnestad created compositions for the orchestra. Arnestad served as a member of the Norwegian Society of Composers’ advisory board from 1974 to 1979 and was a member of the same organisation’s scholarship committee from 1971 to 1981.

Production

Selected works
 Konsert for klaver og orkester (1976) 
 Arabesk (1975) 
 Toccata (1972) 
 Musikk for tre treblåsere (1971), 
 Sonate for trombone og piano (1971) 
 Væsletjennet for flute solo and strings (1970) 
 Ritagliata (1967), Ouverture (1970) 
 Klaversonate (1967) 
 Smeden og Bageren (J. H. Wessel, baritone and orchestra, 1966) 
 Cavatina Cambiata (premiered 1965) 
 Dopplersonans (1964) 
 Kvintett for fløyte og strykekvartett (1963) 
 Suite i gamle danserytmer (kammerorkester med fløyte og obo 1963) 
 Aria appassionata (1962) 
 Sekstett for fløyte, klarinett, fagott, klaver, bratsj, cello (1959) 
 Konsert for fiolin og orkester (1956, premiered 1960) 
 Suite nr. 2 (premiered 1964)
 2 konsert-suiter fra et symfonisk mysteriespill: Suite nr. 1 (1953) 
 Missa Brevis for kor og orkester (uroppført 1951), I. N. R. I. (1954) 
 Conversation for klaver og orkester (1949, uroppført 1950) 
 Constellation (premiered 1948) 
 Strykekvartett (premiered 1947) 
 Meditation for orchestra (1947)

Discography
 Christian Eggen, Oslo Sinfonietta, Norges Musikkhistorie - Bind 5 (2001)
 Oslo Philharmonic Orchestra, Orchestral Interference / Finn Arnestad (1996)
 Geir Henning Braaten, Norwegian Pianorama (1984)

References

External links
List of works supplied by the National Library of Norway

1915 births
20th-century classical composers
Norwegian contemporary classical composers
Norwegian male classical composers
1994 deaths
20th-century Norwegian male musicians